Crime Story (formerly titled The Last Job and Reckoning) is a 2021 American crime drama thriller film written and directed by Adam Lipsius and starring Richard Dreyfuss and Mira Sorvino.

Synopsis

A former mob boss Ben Myers (Richard Dreyfuss) embarks on a deadly rampage of revenge after he becomes the target of a home robbery. 
The perpetrators think they have got all the footage from the home cameras but Myers has one hidden which captures the whole robbery.
Myers then tracks the perps down with the help of some of the contacts he has left.
However, when his family gets caught in the crossfire, he must finally face the consequences of his dark past.

Cast
Richard Dreyfuss as Ben Myers
Mira Sorvino as Nick Wallace
Pruitt Taylor Vince as Tommy
D. W. Moffett as Congressman Billings
Cress Williams as Jimmy
Alejandra Rivera Flaviá as Celina
Aiden Malik as Yonatan
Joanna Walchuk as Cherry
Megan McFarland as Nun
Andrea Frankle as Mrs. Billings

Production
Filming began in February 2019 in Savannah, Georgia.

Release
The film was released in theaters and on demand and digital platforms on August 13, 2021.

Reception
On review aggregator website Rotten Tomatoes, the film holds an approval rating of 20% based on 15 reviews, with an average rating of 4.1/10.

Dennis Harvey, writing for Variety, described the film as an "inept muddle", and stated that it "has the feel of an enterprise whose script wasn’t quite ready for “action!”: Half the dialogue sounds haplessly improvised, with sporadic voiceover narration coming off as an equally forlorn attempt to belatedly cohere a half-baked whole." Jeffrey M. Anderson of Common Sense Media gave the film a score of 2 out of 5 stars, writing: "Despite teaming up two Oscar-winning actors, Adam Lipsius' generically titled crime drama is an overwrought, often-confusing assembly of twitchy camerawork and a relentless score."

References

External links
 

2021 films
2021 crime thriller films
2021 thriller drama films
2021 crime drama films
American crime thriller films
American thriller drama films
American crime drama films
Films shot in Savannah, Georgia
2020s English-language films
2020s American films